Podkozara Donja  (Cyrillic: Подкозара Доња) is a village in the municipality of Novo Goražde, Republika Srpska, Bosnia and Herzegovina.

Demographics 
According to the 2013 census, its population was 254, with 97 of them living in the Goražde part and 157 in the Novo Goražde part.

References

Populated places in Novo Goražde
Populated places in Goražde